"Down in Mexico" is the debut single by the Coasters, released in 1956. The song was written by Jerry Leiber and Mike Stoller and appears on the 1957 album, The Coasters. It reached No. 8 on the R&B chart in 1956.

This song is about a person, who goes down to Mexico, where he meets a boss, who wears a red bandanna, and plays the piano in a honky-tonk. Also, a dance erupts, where a Mexican girl dances wildly with the narrator of the song.

This song features castanets.

This song features a spoken recitation, in a Mexican accent, before the song's fade, by Carl Gardner.

The song appears in the film Death Proof, directed by Quentin Tarantino. The version used is a re-recording done in 1973. The song also appears in The Hangover Part III, directed by Todd Phillips.

Personnel
 Mike Stoller, piano
 Gil Bernal, saxophone
 Barney Kessell, guitar
 probably Adolph Jacobs, guitar
 Ralph Hamilton, bass
 Jesse Sailes, drums
 Chico Guerrero, congas

Cover versions
Bobby Short on his 1958 album, Speaking of Love
Ella Mae Morse on her 1985 album, Sensational
Deja Voodoo on their 1988 album, Too Cool to Live, Too Smart to Die
Kaleidoscope on their 1991 album, Greetings from Kartoonistan...(We Ain't Dead Yet)
Ronnie Dawson on his 1994 album, Monkey Beat!
Manfred Mann on his 2004 album 2006

References

1956 songs
1956 debut singles
Songs written by Jerry Leiber and Mike Stoller
The Coasters songs
Atco Records singles
Mexico in fiction